Sefidan-e Atiq (also Romanized as Sefīdān-e ‘Atīq and Safīdān-Atiq; also known as Dāsh Esparān, Dash Esperan, Dash-Isperan, Dāsh Ispirān, and Sefidané Atigh) is a village in Esperan Rural District, in the Central District of Tabriz County, East Azerbaijan Province, Iran. At the 2006 census, its population was 251, in 51 families.

References 

Populated places in Tabriz County